is a Japanese politician of the Liberal Democratic Party, a member of the House of Representatives in the Diet (national legislature).

Career
A native of Kyoto, Kyoto, Yamamoto attended Kansai University as an undergraduate and received a master's degree from Kyoto University. He was elected to the House of Representatives for the first time in 2005.

His profile on the LDP website:
Director, Committee on security
Director, Delibative Council on Political Ethics
Member, Committee on Fundamental National Politics

On August 4 2022 it was reported that Yamamoto previously attended a Unification Church event where he had presented Hak Ja Han Moon with carnations, calling her "Mother Moon." This attracted controversy as part of wider media coverage on the Unification Church's connections with the LDP following the assassination of Shinzo Abe.

Revisionism on Comfort women issues
Affiliated to the openly revisionist lobby Nippon Kaigi, Yamamoto was among the LDP members of the Diet who signed 'THE FACTS', an advertising published in 2007 in the Washington Post seeking a full withdrawal of the United States House of Representatives House Resolution 121 on Imperial Japan sexual slavery system ('Comfort women').

References

External links 
 Official website in Japanese.

1975 births
Living people
People from Kyoto
Kansai University alumni
Kyoto University alumni
Koizumi Children
Members of Nippon Kaigi
Members of the House of Representatives (Japan)
Liberal Democratic Party (Japan) politicians